Curren Chan (foaled 31 March 2007) is a Japanese Thoroughbred racehorse who won two JRA Awards. After finishing second on her only start as a juvenile she won three minor races from five starts as a three-year-old in 2010. She emerged as a top-class sprinter in 2011 when she won five consecutive races including the Hanshin Himba Stakes, Hakodate Sprint Stakes, Keeneland Cup and the Sprinters Stakes and won the JRA Award for Best Sprinter or Miler. In 2012 she was overshadowed by her stablemate Lord Kanaloa but won the Takamatsunomiya Kinen and took the JRA Award for Best Older Filly or Mare.

Background
Curren Chan is a grey mare bred in Japan by Shadai Farms. She was sired by Kurofune, an American-bred stallion who won the NHK Mile Cup and the Japan Cup Dirt in 2001. As a breeding stallion, his other progeny have included Clarity Sky (NHK Mile Cup), Sleepless Night (Sprinters Stakes), Fusaichi Richard (Asahi Hai Futurity Stakes) and Whale Capture (Victoria Mile). Curren Chan's dam Spring Ticket was a successful racemare who won six of her nineteen races between 2000 and 2002. She was a female-line descendant of Falkar, an American broodmare who was imported to Japan in 1953.

As a foal in 2007 the filly was consigned to the Japanese Select Sale and was bought for 26,250,000 yen by Takashi Suzuki. She was trained throughout her racing career by Takayuki Yasuda and was ridden in most of her races by Kenichi Ikezoe.

Racing career

2009–2010: early career
On her only appearance as a two-year-old, Curren Chan contested an event for previously unraced horses over 1200 metres on dirt at Hanshin Racecourse on 26 December and finished second of the twelve runners behind the colt Takano King.

On her first appearance as a three-year-old Curren Chan won a maiden race over 1200 metres on dirt at Kyoto Racecourse in January and followed up the following month with her first victory on turf when she won the Moegi Sho over the same distance at Chukyo Racecourse. She was then moved up in class and distance for the Grade II Fillies' Revue over 1400 metres at Hanshin and finished eighth of the sixteen runners, three lengths behind the winner Sound Barrier. In her two remaining races that year, the filly was brought back in distance to 1200 metres. She finished second to Keiai Daisy in the Listed Aoi Stakes at Kyoto in May and then won at Hakodate Racecourse in June.

2011: four-year-old season
Curren Chan began her third season at Kyoto, finishing third to Orion Stars and Ken Bridge L in the Fushimi Stakes and then winning the Yamashiro Stakes on 19 February. On 9 April the filly was moved back up to Grade II level and started 3.2/1 favourite against seventeen opponents in the Hanshin Himba Stakes over 1400 metres at Hanshin. She won the race by half a length from En Ciel Bleu with Spring Thunder another half length away in third. On 3 July Curren Chan took on male opposition in the Grade III Hakodate Sprint Stakes over 1200 metres. She started the 1.7/1 favourite and won by a neck from the three-year-old colt T M Otaka.

On 28 August Curren Chan began her autumn campaign in the Grade III Keeneland Cup over 1200 metres at Sapporo Racecourse and started the odds-on favourite in a sixteen-runner field. She recorded her fourth consecutive victory as she won by a neck and a nose from B B Guldan and Pas de Trois. Curren Chan was moved up to Grade I level for the first time in the Sprinters Stakes over 1200 metres at Nakayama Racecourse on 2 October. The Singapore champion Rocket Man started odds-on favourite ahead of Dasher Go Go who had finished second in the race in 2010, with Curren Chan the 10.2/1 third choice in the betting. The other fancied runners included the Hong Kong challenger Lucky Nine, San Carlo (New Zealand Trophy), Fifth Petal and A Shin Virgo (Centaur Stakes). Curren Chan recorded her most important success as she won by one ad three-quarter lengths and a nose from Pas de Trois and A Shin Virgo.

On her final appearance of the season, Curren Chan was sent to Hong Kong for the Hong Kong Sprint at Sha Tin Racecourse in December. She proved the best of the overseas runners but was beaten into fifth behind the locally trained runners Lucky Nine, Joy And Fun, Entrapment and Little Bridge.

In January 2012, at the JRA Awards Curren Chan was named Japan's champion sprinter or miler for the 2011 season taking 270 of the 285 votes. She also finished runner-up behind Buena Vista in the voting for the JRA Award for Best Older Filly or Mare.

2012: five-year-old season

On her first run in 2012 Curren Chan started favourite for the Grade III Ocean Stakes over 1200 metres at Nakayama on 3 March and finished fourth behind the outsiders One Carat, Grand Prix Angel and Bering Boy. Three weeks later the mare stepped back up to Grade I level for the Takamatsunomiya Kinen at Chukyo Racecourse and started the 2.9/1 second favourite behind the four-year-old colt Lord Kanaloa also trained by Takayuki Yasuda. The other runners included San Carlo, Dasher Go Go, Grand Prix Angel, Bering Boy, Jo Cappuccino (NHK Mile Cup) and Majin Prosper (twice winner of the CBC Sho over the course and distance). Curren Chan took the lead on the turn into the straight and recorded her second Grade I victory as she held off several challengers to win by a neck and half a length from San Carlo and Lord Kanaloa.

After a break of over five months, Curren Chan returned in the Grade II Centaur Stakes at Hanshin on 9 September and finished fourth behind Epice Arome, Lord Kanaloa and En Ciel Bleu. Three weeks later the mare attempted to repeat her 2011 success in the Sprinters Stakes and started the 6/4 favourite in a sixteen-runner field. Curren Chan raced in mid-division before taking the lead inside the last 200 metres but was overtaken and beaten three quarters of the length into second by Lord Kanaloa. On her final racecourse appearance Curren Chan ran for the second time in the Hong Kong Sprint and finished seventh of the twelve runners behind Lord Kanaloa.

In the JRA Awards for 2012 Curren Chan won the JRA Award for Best Older Filly or Mare, taking 177 of the 289 votes. She also finished runner-up to Lord Kanaloa in the voting for champion sprinter or miler.

Pedigree

References

2007 racehorse births
Racehorses bred in Japan
Racehorses trained in Japan
Thoroughbred family 13-c